Luca Zingaretti (born 11 November 1961) is an Italian actor and film director, known for playing Salvo Montalbano in the Inspector Montalbano mystery series based on the character and novels created by Andrea Camilleri. Zingaretti is a native of Rome, and the older brother of politician Nicola Zingaretti.

Life and career 
At the age of 17 he joined  Rimini Football Club, but abandoned his career as a footballer after a few months in order to attend the National Academy of Dramatic Art Silvio D' Amico.

In 2004 he separated from his first wife, the journalist and writer Margherita D'Amico, niece of Suso Cecchi D'Amico; they divorced in 2008.  In 2005 he became romantically linked with the actress Luisa Ranieri, whom he met on the set of the television mini-series Cefalonia, and with whom he has two daughters, born in 2011 and 2015 respectively.  The couple married on 23 June 2012 in a civil ceremony at the Donnafugata castle in Sicily.

Zingaretti graduated from the National Academy of Dramatic Art Silvio D' Amico in 1984 and began his acting career in the theatre, often working with director Luca Ronconi, appearing in such diverse plays as Chekhov's Three Sisters, Shakespeare's Titus Andronicus, and Martin Sherman's Bent.

Zingaretti made his film debut in 1987 with a minor role in Gli occhiali d'oro ("The Gold-Rimmed Glasses") — directed by Giuliano Montaldo — and in the same year first appeared on television in Il Giudice Istruttore ("The Investigating Magistrate)", directed by Florestano Vancini and Gianluigi Calderone. He first gained critical attention with his role as the ferocious "Ottorino" in Marco Risi's 1994 film Il branco ("The Wolf Pack"). In 1996 he starred with Sabrina Ferilli in the film Vite strozzate ("Strangled Lives"), directed by Ricky Tognazzi.

However, stardom arrived with his leading role as Commissario Salvo Montalbano, in the Inspector Montalbano series of TV films, initially shown on RAI Two, and then RAI One, as well as many other European TV channels and SBS in Australia. The series, which started running from 1999 and is still ongoing, consists of 36 films through 2020.

After his success he became one of the most in-demand dramatic actors in Italy appearing in such films as: 
 Prima dammi un bacio ("First Give Me a Kiss") (2003), dir. Ambrogio Lo Giudice
 I giorni dell'abbandono ("Days of Abandonment") (2005), dir. Roberto Faenza
 Tutte le donne della mia vita ("All The Women Of My Life") (2007), dir. Simona Izzo

On TV he appeared in :
 Perlasca – Un eroe Italiano ("Perlasca : An Italian Hero") (2002)
 Doppio agguato ("Double Ambush") (2003)
 Cefalonia ("Kefalonia") (2005)
 Alla luce del sole ("To The Sunlight") (2005), a film on the life of Don Pino Puglisi.

In 2008 he appeared in four new Montalbano films, and in the same period adapted and directed the play La Sirena, from a story by Giuseppe Tomasi di Lampedusa.

In 2009 he continued to appear in the theatre and also worked on the film Noi credevamo, directed by Mario Martone, and set during the reunification of Italy in which he played Francesco Crispi. He also appeared in the film Il figlio più piccolo ("The Younger Son"), directed by Pupi Avati and co-starring Christian De Sica.

In 2010 four new Montalbano episodes were produced, broadcast by RAI One on 14 March 2011 and the three following Mondays.

Between 2011 and 2012 he was in the cast of the comedies Immaturi - Il viaggio, dir. Paolo Genovese and Il comandante e la cicogna (Garibaldi's Lovers), dir. Silvio Soldini. He was among the stars of the international production Asterix & Obelix in the service of His Majesty, dir. Laurent Tirard in which he played a Roman general, and participated in a minor role in  Romanzo di una strage – (Piazza Fontana: The Italian Conspiracy), dir. Marco Tullio Giordana.  Also in 2012, he starred in two television films about two characters from twentieth century Italian history. First was  Paolo Borsellino - I 57 giorni – (Paolo Borsellino - the 57 Days), dir. Alberto Negrin, made on the occasion of the twentieth anniversary of the death of Giovanni Falcone, while the latter told the life of the industrialist Adriano Olivetti - La forza di un sogno – (Adriano Olivetti - the Strength of a Dream), dir. Michele Soavi. In 2014 he starred in the film in Maldamore, dir. Angelo Longoni, with his wife, Luisa Ranieri, Alessio Boni, Claudia Gerini and Ambra Angiolini, and in Perez., dir. Edoardo De Angelis, together with Marco D'Amore; moreover the same year he returned to TV with the mini-series  Il giudice meschino – (The Indolent Judge), dir. Carlo Carlei, with his wife.

In 2013 another four episodes of Montalbano were broadcast by RAI One, and two more each year from 2016 through 2020.

Filmography

Films

Television

Others

Director
(2000) Gulu - Documentary
(2007) Passa una vela... spingendo la notte più in là - Play
(2007) Conversazioni con Suso - Documentary
(2008) La Sirena - Play
(2013) La torre d'avorio - Play
(2015) The Pride - Play
(2018) The Deep Blue Sea - Play

Voiceovers
(2003) Finding Nemo, dir. Andrew Stanton and Lee Unkrich - voice of Marlin in Italian version
(2006) La Grande Finale, Official documentary of the 2006 FIFA World Cup - narrator
(2010) L'altra verità (Route Irish), dir. Ken Loach - voice of Fergus (Mark Womack)
(2016) Finding Dory, dir. Andrew Stanton and Angus MacLane - voice of Marlin in Italian version
(2016) Le confessioni, dir. Roberto Andò - voice of Daniel Roché (Daniel Auteuil)

Theatre
La Sirena, from the story "Lighea" by Giuseppe Tomasi di Lampedusa, adapted by Luca Zingaretti
Saint Joan by George Bernard Shaw, dir. Luca Ronconi
Le due commedie in commedia by Giambattista Andreini, dir. Luca Ronconi
Bent by Martin Sherman, dir. Marco Mattolini
I villeggianti and La madre by Maxim Gorky, dir. Sandro Sequi
Come gocce su pietre roventi by Rainer Werner Fassbinder, dir. Marco Mattolini
The Fairy Queen by F. Pourcell, dir. Luca Ronconi
Three Sisters by Anton Chekhov, dir. Luca Ronconi
Murder in the Cathedral by T. S. Eliot, dir. Franco Branciaroli
Titus Andronicus by William Shakespeare, dir. Peter Stein
The Last Days of Mankind by Karl Kraus, dir. Luca Ronconi
The Madwoman of Chaillot  by Jean Giraudoux, dir. Luca Ronconi
Crimes of the Heart by Beth Henley, dir. Nanni Loy
The Break of Noon by Paul Claudel, dir. Franco Però
Trompe l'oeil by Cagnoni, Camilli, Martelli, dir. Federico Cagnoni
Maratona di New York  by Edoardo Erba, dir. Edoardo Erba
The Prisoners of War by J. R. Ackerley, dir. Luca Zingaretti and  Fabio Ferrari
Line by  Al Horowitz, dir. Piero Maccarinelli
Cannibal by Richard Crowe and Richard Zajdlic, dir. Patrick Rossi Gastaldi
Separation by Tom Kempinski, dir. Patrick Rossi Gastaldi
Three Hotels, by Jon Robin Baitz, dir. Toni Bertorelli
Confortate il male antico, by Gianclaudio Mantovani, dir. Luca Zingaretti
The Ivory Tower, by Ronald Harwood, dir. Luca Zingaretti 
The Pride, by Alexi Kaye Campbell, dir. Luca Zingaretti

Awards
 - In 2003 Zingaretti was made a Knight of the Order of Merit of the Republic.
 (2004) Nastro d'Argento ("Silver Ribbon") for Best Dubbing for the voice of Marlin in Finding Nemo (Italian version)
 (2005) David di Donatello for Best Actor Award for Alla luce del sole
 (2005) Karlovy Vary Best Actor Award for Alla luce del sole
 (2008) Middle East International Film Festival Black Pearl for Best Actor for Sangue pazzo
 (2010) Nastro d'Argento ("Silver Ribbon") as Best Supporting Actor for Il figlio più piccolo and La nostra vita.

References

External links

 

1961 births
Living people
Male actors from Rome
Italian male film actors
Nastro d'Argento winners
Italian male stage actors
Italian theatre directors
Italian male television actors
20th-century Italian male actors
21st-century Italian male actors
Accademia Nazionale di Arte Drammatica Silvio D'Amico alumni